William Sapp may refer to:

 William Fletcher Sapp (1824–1890), United States Attorney and Representative from Iowa
 William Frederick Sapp (1856–1917), American politician from Kansas
 William R. Sapp (1804–1875), U. S. Representative from Ohio
 William Sapp (serial killer) (born 1962), American serial killer